"All the Pretty Little Horses" (also known as "Hush-a-bye") is a traditional lullaby from the United States. It has inspired dozens of recordings and adaptations, as well as the title of Cormac McCarthy's 1992 novel All the Pretty Horses. The melody is also used in the score of the film Misty of Chincoteague based on the book by Marguerite Henry.

Origin

The origin of this song is not fully known.  The song is commonly thought to be of African-American origin.

Author Lyn Ellen Lacy is often quoted as the primary source for the theory that suggests the song was "originally sung by an African-American slave who could not take care of her baby because she was too busy taking care of her master's child. She would sing this song to her master's child". However, Lacy's book Art and Design in Children's Books is not an authority on the heritage of traditional American folk songs, but rather a commentary on the art and design in children's literature.  Still, some versions of "All the Pretty Little Horses" contain added lyrics that make this theory a possibility.

One such version of "All the Pretty Little Horses" is provided in the book American Ballads and Folksongs by prominent ethnomusicologist Alan Lomax, though he makes no claim of the song's African-American origins.  "Way down yonder, In de medder, There's a po' lil lambie, De bees an' de butterflies, Peckin' out its eyes, De po' lil lambie cried, "Mammy!"" Another version contains the lyrics "Buzzards and flies, Picking out its eyes, Pore little baby crying". The theory would suggest that the lyrics "po' lil lambie cried, "Mammy"" is in reference to the slaves who were often separated from their own families in order to serve their owners. However, this verse is very different from the rest of the lullaby, suggesting that the verse may have been added later or has a different origin from the rest of the song.  The verse also appears in the song "Ole Cow" and older versions of the song "Black Sheep, Black Sheep".

A generation before Alan Lomax, writer Dorothy Scarborough, educated at Oxford University and holding a PhD from Columbia University, researched folk songs throughout the American South and devoted four pages of her book On the Trail of Negro Folksongs (1925) to variations of this song, all of which were provided, directly or indirectly, by African Americans.

Meaning
The best-known versions of the song are written from the perspective of the mother or caretaker singing a baby to sleep.  The singer is promising the child that when he or she awakes, the child "shall have all the pretty little horses."

An extra verse appears in some versions of the song.  The added lyrics appear to be from the perspective of an African-American caretaker who is singing about how her own baby, her "lambie", is not being cared for due to her care of her charge.  The origin of this verse cannot be known, since the refrain also appears in the folksongs "Ole Cow" and "Black Sheep, Black Sheep".

Lyrics

Dorothy Scarborough, 1925
Hush you bye, don’t you cry,
Go to sleepy, little baby.
when you wake, 
You shall have,
all the pretty little horses.

Blacks and Bays,
dapples and grays, 
Coach and six a little horses.
Hush-a-by, Don't you cry,
Go to sleep, my little baby.

Additional verse (included in some versions)
Way down yonder
In the meadow
Poor little baby crying momma
Birds and the butterflies 
Flutter 'round his eyes 
Poor little baby crying momma"

Or

Down in the meadow
a wee little lamb
poor thing crying mama
birds and butterflies 
flutter round its eyes
poor things crying mama

Popular version
 Hush you bye, Don't you cry
 Go to sleep-y, my little ba - by.
 When you wake, you shall have
 All the pretty lit-tle hor-ses

 Blacks and bays, Dap-ples and grays,
 Coach---------- and six-a lit-tle hor - ses.

 Hush you bye, Don't you cry,
 Go to sleep-y lit-tle ba - by
 When you wake, you'll have sweet cake, and
 All the pret-ty lit-tle hor-ses

 A brown and a gray and a black and a bay
 and a Coach and six-a lit-tle hor - ses
 A black and a bay and a brown and a gray and a Coach__
 and six-a lit-tle hor-ses. Hush you bye,
 Don't you cry, Oh you pret-ty lit-tle ba - by. Go to sleep-y lit-tle
 ba - by. Oh you pret-ty lit-tle ba-by.

Musical and literary adaptations
"All the Pretty Little Horses" has inspired a variety of recordings (both direct performances of the known lyrics and adaptations thereof).
Some of the singers who have recorded adaptations of "All the Pretty Little Horses" include (but are not limited to):

Alan Lomax on Texas Folk Songs
The Mystics "Hushabye"
Víctor Jara and Quilapayún, 1968
Barbara Dickson
Alfred Deller, in the style of the Renaissance countertenor voice
Caroline Herring
Calexico
The Chieftains with Patty Griffin
Coil, as "All the Pretty Little Horses", for their album Black Antlers, 2004
Current 93, two versions as "All the Pretty Little Horses", for their 1996 album of the same name, one sung by Nick Cave. A third version, sung by Shirley Collins, appears on the compilation Calling for Vanished Faces
The Big 3 one their album "Live At The Recording Studio", in 1964
Esther Ofarim for the Album "That's our Song" (1965)
Five Folk Songs for Soprano and Band, as part of a 1963 folk song suite by Bernard Gilmore
Friends of Dean Martinez
Grant Campbell for The Burrowers
Tanya Goodman (singer) for Cedarmont Kids - Lullabies - All Night All Day 
Holly Cole, as "All the Pretty Little Horses", for her 1997 album Dark Dear Heart
Joan Baez on her 1968 album Baptism: A Journey Through Our Time
Jon Crosse, in his 1985 album Lullabies Go Jazz: Sweet Songs for Sweet Dreams, with Clare Fischer, Putter Smith, and Luis Conte
The Journeymen on their 1963 album New Directions in Folk Music
Jonathan Meiburg, on his 2004 album Buteo Buteo
Judy Collins, for her 1990 album Baby's Bedtime
The Jukebox Band, during the Lullaby Medley in a Shining Time Station episode Stacy Forgets Her Name
Kenny Loggins, as "All the Pretty Little Ponies", for his 1994 album Return to Pooh Corner with David Crosby & Graham Nash singing harmony vocals. 
Kidsongs, on Good Night, Sleep Tight 1986 video and album
Kristin Hersh, as "Whole Heap of Little Horses", for her 1998 album Murder, Misery and Then Goodnight
Laura Gibson, as "All the Pretty Horses", for her 2008 EP Six White Horses
Laura Veirs, on her 2011 album Tumble Bee
Laurie Berkner
Sam Cahoon as "All the Pretty Little Horses", on his 2008 album The Dismal Stars and the Clouds Afar
Stephanie Betjemann, as "Բոլոր Գեղեցիկ Ձիերը", arranged by Karenn Presti, on the 2017 album My First Armenian Songbook, in Western Armenian translation
Olivia Newton-John
Peter, Paul and Mary, as "Hush-A-Bye", for their 1963 album In the Wind
Charlotte Church, "The Little Horses" on her album Enchantment released October 9, 2001.
The New Christy Minstrels, on their album Live From Ledbetters, recorded live on April 10, 11 & 12, 1964, released in 1999.
Hayley Westenra, on her album, Hushabye, which is dedicated to the Duke and Duchess of Cambridge's baby.
Odetta, on her album At the Gate of Horn, released in 1957.
Aaron Copland composed an arrangement of "The Little Horses" for voice and piano as the second set of Old American Songs (1952)
Shawn Colvin
It has also inspired several pieces of literature, including Cormac McCarthy's award-winning novel in 1992 (All the Pretty Horses), a young adult short story in the 1998 Here There Be Ghosts collection by Jane Yolen and David Wilgus, as well as Lisa Saport's 1999 children's picture book adaptation (All the Pretty Little Horses: A Traditional Lullaby). Additionally, it is sung by Viv in Ken Kesey's novel Sometimes a Great Notion.

The song appears in Silkwood drama, performed by Georges Delerue and sung by Meryl Streep and Cher.
Leon Rosselson,as  "Pretty Little Horses" on the 2014 album "Lullaby For Naila"

References

Sources
Engle, Robert B. Waltz and David G. The Ballad Index 2011 (accessed July 19, 2012)
Lomax, John, and Alan Lomax. "All The Pretty Little Horses". New York City: Ludlow Music Inc., 1934.

External links
Lyrics - National Institute of Environmental Health Sciences, "Kids' Pages"

American folk songs
American children's songs
Traditional children's songs
Songs about horses
Lullabies
Year of song unknown
Songwriter unknown